Doteli, or Dotyali is an Indo-Aryan language spoken by about 800,000 people, most of whom live in Nepal. It is a dialect of Khas, which is an ancient form of the modern Nepali language, and is written in the Devanagari script. It has official status in Nepal as per Part 1, Section 6 of the Constitution of Nepal 2072 (2015). There are four main dialects of Doteli, namely Baitadeli, Bajhangi Nepali, Darchuli and Doteli. The mutual intelligibility between these dialects is high and all dialects of Doteli are able to share language-based materials.

Names of the language 
The language is known by various names in the far–western region of Nepal, according to the districts.

Official status
The Language Commission of Nepal has recommended Dotyali language as official language in Sudurpashchim Province.

Origin and history 
According to Rahul Sankrityayan Doteli or Dotyali is a dialect of the Kumaoni language which was brought to Doti by a section of the Katyuri dynasty of Kumaon, which had ruled over Doti until 1790.The Doti kingdom was formed after the Katyuri kingdom broke up into eight different princely states. In Nepal, Doteli is considered a Nepali dialect. However, local intellectuals and people of Doti, those who speak Doteli, are increasingly demanding their language to be recognized as one of the national languages of Nepal.

References

External links

 Easy Nepali Typing
 English to Nepali Converter
 Type Nepali with Nepali Unicode
 Type In Nepali Unicode
 Saral Nepali Unicode

Languages of Nepal
Languages written in Devanagari
Languages of Sudurpashchim Province
Languages of Karnali Province